24-7-365 or 24/7/365 means "at any time, all year round."

24-7-365 may also refer to:

24-7-365 (N2Deep album), 1994
24-7-365 (Neal McCoy album), 2000
"24 / 7 / 365", a song by Surfaces from Surf
"247365", a song by John Farnham from Jack

See also
 "365247" (flip) a song by Day6 from The Book of Us: Entropy